North Cross School is an independent, coeducational, college-preparatory day school in Roanoke, Virginia for children from age three to twelfth grade. The school was founded in 1944 in Salem, Virginia.

Accreditation
North Cross is accredited by the Virginia Association of Independent Schools.

Memberships
North Cross is a member of the National Association for College Admission Counseling, the Potomac and Chesapeake Association for College Admissions Counseling, the Cum Laude Society and the Council for Advancement and Support of Education.

References

1944 establishments in Virginia
Educational institutions established in 1944
Private K-12 schools in Virginia
Schools in Roanoke County, Virginia